Roger Holman is a British musician and composer. He is best known for the televised musical Smike, and as the co-writer of Stephanie De Sykes's two hit singles.

As a performer, Holman released a 1971 self-produced single with two songs, "Act Like a Man" and "Back On My Feet", both co-written with his writing partner Simon May. The Holman/May duo released a 45 record the following year using the stage name "Sqeek". In 1973, Holman collaborated with Simon May and Clive Barnett to create the musical Smike, which was televised on the BBC. Holman also co-wrote with May the UK top-20 hits for  Stephanie De Sykes "Born with a Smile on My Face", which in 1974 peaked at number two, and "We'll Find Our Day", which in 1975 peaked at number 17. In 1975, Holman released another solo effort on EMI Records performing the songs "Laugh, Laugh, Laugh" and "Lay Your Head in the Grass".

In 2011, Holman wrote a musical adaptation of Thomas Hardy's Far from the Madding Crowd.

Early life 
Roger Holman was born on 4 July 1948 in Exeter, Devon. He has a younger sister, Elizabeth. Both of his parents were teachers. His father, Peter Thomas Holman, was an accredited pianist and organist, Licentiate of Trinity College London and an organist at Exeter Cathedral. His mother, Charlotte Jervaise (née Downing) was an accomplished pianist and was a life-long organist and choir mistress.

Roger Holman was a pupil at Dauntsey's School in Wiltshire where he formed a pop band with Simon May (the composer of BBC TV’s EastEnders, Howard’s Way themes, etc) and three other pupils. Roger and Simon were to form a songwriting partnership that was to last for over a decade.

Professional Careers

Photography 
On leaving school, Roger embarked on a photographic course at Salisbury College of Photography followed by three years working as a photographer for large public relations company in London’s Park Lane.  Clients he provided work for were diverse and included Carreras Cigarettes, the Scotch Whisky Association, Kellogg's, Optilon Zips, the Arab League and Chevron.

Songwriting & Composer 
It was during his days as a photographer that Roger and Simon, who were then in a house-share with others in Kingston upon Thames, Surrey, wrote and recorded several songs under the name of Simon, Plug and Grimes (“Way In, Way Out”, “Don’t Push Me”, “Pull Together” on the President label, as well as “Is This A Dream” for Deram Records). They also wrote the song “Pukwudgie” that was to become a minor hit for the comedian, Charlie Drake in 1972.  As a result of this, the pair, who had been in a songwriting partnership since school days, were signed to ATV Music, based at the time in London’s Bruton Street.  ATV Music retained a lucrative list of budding songwriters, including Lynsey De Paul, Barry Blue, Ron Roker, Tony Hiller and also administered the catalogues of countless others including John Lennon, Paul McCartney and Neil Sedaka.

Between 1971 and 1975, whilst under contract to ATV Music, Roger and Simon composed many pieces in a variety of genres for the ATV Network and BBC TV.  One of the most successful was a piece called “Clock In” that was used by the ITV network as a minute-long link between schools’ programmes, four or five times a day on weekdays during school terms. It was, singularly, the biggest PRS earner in the UK for the entire year in which it ran.

For most of their ATV years, Simon remained in the position of Head of Modern Languages at Kingston Grammar School, Surrey where he and history teacher, Clive Barnett, decided to write a musical as an end-of-term production for the pupils to perform. “Smike” was born and premiered at the lowly Surbiton Assembly Rooms, Surrey in June 1973. Much to the annoyance of the BBC TV producer and director Paul Ciani, Roger, who was booked to play in the musical’s band at the same time, was unable to fly to BBC Scotland in Glasgow to record the theme song to a new BBC1 TV series that Paul was producing called Crazy Bus, starring the comedians Hope and Keen, Peter Goodwright and Ruth Kettlewell. Having calmed down, Paul asked if he could come and see the musical.  As a direct result, Smike was scheduled in an hour-long potted version for transmission on BBC2 on Christmas Sunday 1973. The TV production starred Beryl Reid as Mrs Squeers, Andrew Keir as Mr Squeers, Leonard Whiting as Nicholas, Christine McKenna (probably best known for her starring role as Christina in 13 episodes of Flambards  in 1979) and Ivan Sharrock (played “Jackie Merrick” for nine years from 1980 in Emmerdale) as Smike. The original cast also featured DJ Neil Fox, a pupil at Kingston Grammar at the time, as one of the schoolboys. The musical was repeated as Show Of The Week on BBC2 in April 1974 and repeated for a third time on BBC1 TV on Christmas Sunday 1974. In the forty-five plus years since then, the musical has enjoyed over 5,000 performances in schools and by amateur groups worldwide. Two songs from the musical became hits in the UK – “We’ll Find Our Day” sung by Stephanie De Sykes and “Don’t Let Life Get You Down” by former Four Pennies lead singer, Lionel Morton.

Another lucky break came in 1974 when, late on a Friday evening, Roger was the only writer in the offices of ATV Music when Len Beadle, the general manager, urgently required a song for Jack Barton, the producer of the ITV soap, Crossroads, who was sitting in his office. Roger suggested his composition “Born With A Smile On My Face” (a song written for, and rejected, by Jimmy Tarbuck as the theme of the comedian’s new TV series).  The song was hastily recorded by Stephanie de Sykes a week later at the ATV studios in Birmingham and, within three weeks, was number two in the official BBC charts.

Other songs, written by Roger and covered by artists included “Grin And Bare It” by Barbara Windsor; “Suzie” by Guy Darrell; “Someone Like You” sung by Tails; “Tennis, Cricket Or Gin” by Derek Nimmo; “Thinking Of You This Christmas” by Clive Dunn, “Do What You Wanna Do” by The Pioneers (album track) and “The Dancer “by Bacchus (instrumental). Holman/May compositions used in television adverts ranged broadly from the Air Jamaica advert, screened coast to coast in the U.S.A. to the UK teen mag Look In.

Roger left ATV Music in 1976 and was contracted to Chappells Music where he arranged and produced the Warwick Records TV promoted album “The Magic of Rodgers and Hammerstein” featuring Lorna Dallas and Barry Kent.  He also arranged and produced all the music for inclusion on the Ronco TV promoted album “The Encyclopaedia Of Children's Stories & Nursery Rhymes” featuring a whole host of well-known personalities of the day.

Music Publishing 
After a short spell signed to Southern Music, Roger and the late Slim Miller formed the independent music publishing company Striped Music based in London’s South Audley Street, with funding from its parent company, Tiger Securities. Most notable from this venture was the 1980 hit “You’ve Got To Be A Hustler If You Want To Get On” sung and composed by the late Sue Wilkinson. An amusing anecdote associated to this song is that Sue’s original title for the song was “You’ve Got To Be A SCRUBBER If You Want To Get On” but the BBC wouldn’t have it, so we had to re-record the vocal with a “less offensive” title.

There then followed a complete break living in Devon breeding all manner of poultry and ponies.  During this period and enjoying life far away from the pressure of working in London, Roger retained his creative interests by composing four musicals – Florence, a musical based on part of the life of Florence Nightingale with book by drama director, Terrence Samuel; Far From The Madding Crowd – the musical, a musical adaptation of Hardy’s famous novel; Bojo Bungalo, a spoof sci-fi musical for both children and fun-loving adults and The Singer And The Songwriter, an adult musical play that caused a rumpus because of its adult content after its premiere at the Wharf Theatre, Devizes in 1989.

Theatre Management 
After a short spell at West End Centre, Aldershot, Roger became the artistic director of the Athenaeum Theatre in Warminster bringing a wide range of artistes, from Sir John Mills and Wendy Craig to Lindisfarne, the Chris Barber Jazz Band and Alan Price as well as comedians including George Melly, Sue Perkins and Jeremy Hardy, to the beautiful country theatre in Wiltshire.

Murder Mystery Productions 
For seventeen years from 1977, Roger and his second wife, Lynn, created and promoted one of the most successful murder mystery performance companies, The Touring Murder Mystery Dinner Actors’ Company, that performed a variety of humorous murder mystery plays to over 80,000 people in over a thousand performances whilst they were dining in the top hotels, restaurants, golf clubs, military wardrooms and officers’ messes throughout the west and southern England, the West Midlands, London and South Wales, and even during special events cruising up and down the Thames at Windsor.

Roger and his wife now enjoy semi-retirement in Wiltshire with DIY and musical composition never far from the agenda.

Personal life 
Roger has been married twice. He married his first wife, Amanda, in 1973.  The marriage lasted for seven years until it ended in divorce in 1980. There are two children from the marriage – Natasha (born 1975) and Dominic (born in 1980).  Roger met his second wife, Lynn, in 1989 and, having lived together for twenty-six years, the couple finally married in 2015.  The couple have twin sons, Adam and Ashley (born in 1991).

Discography

References

External links

English musical theatre composers
English songwriters
English television composers
English male composers
Living people
British male songwriters
1948 births